Alanson Wilder Beard (August 20, 1825 – August 27, 1900) was an American who served as a member of the Massachusetts House of Representatives, as Collector of Customs at the Port of Boston and as the Treasurer of Massachusetts.

Early life
Beard was born to  the son of James and Chloe Bartlett (Wilder) Beard on August 20, 1825, in Ludlow, Vermont.

References

Bibliography
  Andrews, Geo. F.: Commonwealth of Massachusetts Official Gazette State Government page 17, (1886).
Boston Daily Globe A. W. BEARD DEAD. Twice Collector of the Port of Boston. Prominent in Civil Service Reform Movement. Born in Vermont and in Youth Taught School. Kept Country Store and Then Came to Boston. Leader in Republican Party for Many Years. page 1. (Aug 28, 1900).

Footnotes

State treasurers of Massachusetts
Republican Party members of the Massachusetts House of Representatives
People from Ludlow (town), Vermont
1868 United States presidential election
1888 United States presidential election
1825 births
1900 deaths
Collectors of the Port of Boston
19th-century American politicians
Massachusetts Republican Party chairs